The Hadnmauer is the protected ruin of a letzi (defensive barrier across a valley) in the Gailtal valley in Austria, dating to the Late Antiquity. It runs from Rattendorf to Jenig (both in the municipality of Hermagor). Its function was probably the security of Gurina and the area to the east of it. Originally  1.6 kilometres long, only 336 metres survive. On its western side, rooms for the defending personnel are discernible.

References 

Letzi
Ancient history of Austria
Roman fortifications in Austria
Roman fortifications in Noricum
Castles in Carinthia (state)